Harold M. Frost (1921 – 19 June 2004) was an American orthopedist and surgeon considered to be one of the most important researchers and theorists in the field of bone biology and bone medicine of his time. He published nearly 500 peer-reviewed scientific and clinical articles and 16 books. According to the Science Citation Index, he is one of the most cited investigators in skeletal research.

Life 
He received his medical degree from Geisel School of Medicine and Feinberg School of Medicine in 1945. He then did his surgical internship in Worcester, Massachusetts. During this time he was Officer in the Naval Medical Corps from 1946 to 1948. He then did his residency in Orthopedic Surgery in Buffalo General and Children's Hospital in New York state from 1948 to 1953. In 1955, he became an Assistant Professor of Orthopedic Surgery at Yale School of Medicine.

Frost moved to Detroit to take a position at Henry Ford Hospital. There he became the founder and Director of the Orthopedic Research Laboratory. He remained the director until 1973, having served as chairman of the department from 1966 until 1972.

During his time at the Henry Ford Hospital, Frost made many breakthroughs, which changed the paradigm of bone biology.

Frost moved to Pueblo, Colorado in 1973 — drawn by the mountains, climate, and lifestyle — bringing with him his international reputation as a dogged researcher, talented orthopaedist and prolific author. While there he continued his active participation at the Sun Valley Workshops where he interacted with participants to develop cancellous bone histomorphomety (1977), generate and refine the mechanostat hypothesis (1987), and the ever-evolving Utah Paradigm of Bone Physiology (1997).

Academic contributions 
Dr. Harold M. Frost's main academic inputs include:
 Development of Bone Histomorphometry for description of cellular based bone formation and Bone resorption processes
 the eleventh rip Biopsy used for diagnosis of metabolic Bone diseases
 Research on the multi-cellular unit as a key to bone metabolism
 the experimental proof that Estrogen reduces bone formation
 the histological proof of micro-damages in human bone biopsies
 the basic model of the adaptation of the Growth plate to mechanical stress
 the Utah-Paradigm of Bone physiology (Mechanostat-Theorem), an enhancement of Wolff's law stating that Bone adapts to mechanical stress and that hence there is a close link between muscle and bone

Books 
Bone remodelling dynamics, The Henry Ford Hospital surgical monographs, Thomas (Springfield, Ill.), 1963
The laws of bone structure, The Henry Ford Hospital surgical monographs, Thomas (Springfield, Ill.), 1964
Mathematical Elements of Lamellar Bone Remodelling, The Henry Ford Hospital surgical monographs, Thomas (Springfield, Ill.), 1964
Bone biodynamics, Henry Ford Hospital international symposium, [14], Little, Brown (Boston) 1964
The bone dynamics in osteoporosis and osteomalacia, The Henry Ford Hospital surgical monographs, Thomas (Springfield, Ill.), 1966
An introduction to biomechanics, Surgical monographs, Thomas (Springfield, Ill.), 1967, 0398028249
Orthopaedic surgery in spasticity (Orthopaedic lectures Vol. 1), Thomas (Springfield, Ill.), 1972
The physiology of cartilaginous, fibrous, and bony tissue (Orthopaedic lectures Vol. 2), Thomas (Springfield, Ill.), 1972, 
Bone remodeling and its relationship to metabolic bone diseases (Orthopaedic lectures Vol. 3), Thomas (Springfield, Ill.), 1973, 
Bone modeling and skeletal modeling errors (Orthopaedic lectures Vol. 4), Thomas (Springfield, Ill.), 1973, 
Orthopaedic Biomechanics (Orthopaedic Lectures Vol. 5), Thomas (Springfield, Ill.), 1973, 
Symposium on the Osteoporoses Part 1: Physioplogy, Pathophysiology, and Diagnosis, Saunders (Philadelphia), 1981
Symposium on the Osteoporoses Part 2: Therapy and Prevention, Saunders (Philadelphia), 1981
Intermediary organization of the skeleton, CRC Press (Boca Raton, Fla), 1986, 
Bone in clinical orthopedics - Chapter 14: Determinants of bone strength and mass: a summary and clinical implications by Geoff Sumner-Smith, Georg Thieme Verlag, 2002, 
The Utah Paradigm of Skeletal Physiology Vol. 1, ISMNI
The Utah Paradigm of Skeletal Physiology Vol. 2, ISMNI

References

External links
Tribute to Harold Frost in Journal of Musculoskeletal Neuronal Interactions, 4(4), 2004, 348-356
Harold M. Frost, M.D., D.Sc. (hon) – One man’s association in Journal of Musculoskeletal Neuronal Interactions, 6(2), 2006
Harold M Frost William F. Neuman Awardee 2001 in Journal of Musculoskeletal Neuronal Interactions, 2(2), 2001, 117-119
ASBMR Harold M. Frost Young Investigator Award
ISMNI - International Society of Musculoskeletal and Neuronal Interactions
Sun Valley Workshops - IBMS Annual Sun Valley Workshops

American orthopedic surgeons
Histologists
1921 births
2004 deaths
United States Navy Medical Corps officers
Dartmouth College alumni